The 2017–18 Úrvalsdeild kvenna, known as the Olís-deildin for sponsorship reasons, is the 79th season of the Úrvalsdeild kvenna, Iceland's premier women's handball league. Fram won its second straight championship by beating Valur in the Úrvalsdeild finals, three games to one. Steinunn Björnsdóttir was named the playoffs MVP.

HK beat Grótta in the relegation finals, taking its place in the 2018–19 Úrvalsdeild kvenna.

Regular season

Standings

Top goalscorers

Regular season

Playoffs
The playoffs are played between the four first qualified teams with a 1-1-1-1-1 format, playing seeded teams games 1, 3 and 5 at home.

Bracket

Source: HSÍ

References

Handball in Iceland
2018 in Icelandic women's sport